Randall Gordon Gerlach (18 March 1953 – 31 August 2018) was an Australian rules footballer for . Gerlach died in 2018 following a long battle with kidney disease.

References

Australian rules footballers from South Australia
Port Adelaide Football Club players (all competitions)
Port Adelaide Football Club (SANFL) players
2018 deaths
1953 births